Diadie Samassékou (born 11 January 1996) is a Malian professional footballer who plays as a defensive midfielder for Super League Greece club Olympiacos, on loan from 1899 Hoffenheim. He also represents the Mali national team.

Club career

Red Bull Salzburg
In August 2015, Samassékou signed a four-year contract with Red Bull Salzburg, initially joining their farm team FC Liefering. During the 2017–18 season Salzburg had their best ever European campaign. They finished top of their Europa League group, for a record fourth time, before beating Real Sociedad and Borussia Dortmund thus making their first ever appearance in the UEFA Europa League semi-final. On 3 May 2018, he played in the Europa League semi-finals as Olympique de Marseille played out a 1–2 away loss but a 3–2 aggregate win to secure a place in the 2018 UEFA Europa League Final.

Hoffenheim
On 15 August 2019, Hoffenheim announced the signing of Samassékou on a five-year deal.

International career
Samassékou represented Mali at youth level at the 2015 FIFA U-20 World Cup and the 2016 Toulon Tournament. He made his debut for the senior team in a 3–1 friendly win against China PR on 29 June 2014.

Career statistics

Club

International

International goals
Scores and results list Mali's goal tally first.

Honours

Club
Red Bull Salzburg
Austrian Bundesliga 2016–17, 2017–18, 2018–19
Austrian Cup: 2016–17, 2018–19

Individual
Austrian  Bundesliga Team of the Year:  2017–18, 2018–19
 UEFA Europa League Squad of the Season: 2017–18

References

External links

 

1996 births
Living people
Malian footballers
Malian expatriate footballers
Mali international footballers
Mali under-20 international footballers
Austrian Football Bundesliga players
2. Liga (Austria) players
Association football midfielders
FC Liefering players
FC Red Bull Salzburg players
TSG 1899 Hoffenheim players
Olympiacos F.C. players
Malian expatriate sportspeople in Austria
Expatriate footballers in Austria
Malian expatriate sportspeople in Germany
Expatriate footballers in Germany
Malian expatriate sportspeople in Greece
Expatriate footballers in Greece
2019 Africa Cup of Nations players
2021 Africa Cup of Nations players
Bundesliga players
Super League Greece players
Sportspeople from Bamako